Cosmoclopius nigroannulatus is a species of assassin bug family (Reduviidae), in the subfamily Harpactorinae. 
It is a predator of pests in tobacco fields. Its main prey is the tobacco grayish bug, Spartocera dentiventris Berg (Hem.: Coreidae).

Life history
Females require a period of time to mature their reproductive organs after emergence.

References

Reduviidae